Lavash is a thin flatbread usually leavened, traditionally baked in a tandoor (tonir or tanoor) or on a sajj, and common to the cuisines of South Caucasus, Western Asia, and the areas surrounding the Caspian Sea. Lavash is one of the most widespread types of bread in Armenia, Azerbaijan, Iran and Turkey. The traditional recipe can be adapted to the modern kitchen by using a griddle or wok instead of the tonir.

In 2014, "Lavash, the preparation, meaning and appearance of traditional bread as an expression of culture in Armenia" was inscribed in the UNESCO Representative List of the Intangible Cultural Heritage of Humanity. In 2016, making and sharing flatbread (lavash, katyrma, jupka or yufka) in communities of Azerbaijan, Iran, Kazakhstan, Kyrgyzstan and Turkey was inscribed on the list as well. Lavash is similar to yufka, but in Turkish cuisine lavash (lavaş) is prepared with a yeast dough while yufka is typically unleavened.

Etymology
He remarks that semantically this is conceivable since this bread is specifically flat and thin.

Sevan Nişanyan connects both Armenian, Turkish words for lavash ultimately to Aramaic   root meaning 'to knead' and recorded al-Faraj ba'd ash-Shiddah from 1451 as the oldest text to use the term in Turkish. Compare especially to Assyrian Neo-Aramaic  lawasha, a flap of thin bread.

History
Gil Marks traces the history of lavash to the early innovation of cooking thin flatbreads on terracotta griddles. The earliest forms of bread were cooked as cakes either on heated rocks or in embers, but when griddles started to be used breads had to be made thinner to fully cook through without burning like the bread rakik described in the Bible. With the innovation of early ovens, thicker loaves became possible.

According to The American Heritage Dictionary of the English Language lavash is "a thin unleavened flatbread of Armenian origin". In 2014, Lavash was described by the Intangible Cultural Heritage of Humanity as "an expression of Armenian culture". This decision led to protests in Azerbaijan, Iran, Kyrgyzstan, and Kazakhstan over claims that the food was "regional", not "Armenian".

The origin of lavash is often attributed to Armenia, but some scholars say lavash probably originated in Iran. Food historian Gil Marks identifies the origin more generally as the Middle East.

Preparation

Lavash is made with flour, water, yeast, sugar and salt. It can also be made in an unleavened version by omitting sugar and yeast. Toasted sesame seeds and/or poppy seeds are sometimes sprinkled on before baking. Traditionally the dough is rolled out flat and slapped against the hot walls of a clay oven, but modern recipes may adapt for cooking on a wok or tava.

Usage
While quite flexible when fresh, lavash dries out quickly and becomes brittle and hard. The soft form is easier to use when making wrap sandwiches.

In Armenian villages, dried lavash is stacked high in layers to be used later, and when the time comes to rehydrate the bread, it is sprinkled with water to make it softer again. The dried bread is broken up into , while fresh lavash is used to wrap the Armenian specialty dish  and to make other wraps with herbs and cheese. 

In Iran, Turkey and some Middle Eastern countries lavash is used with kebabs to make  wraps like . In its dry form, leftover lavash is used in Iran to make quick meals after being rehydrated with water, butter, or cheese.

In modern recipes lavash can be used like pizza dough.

Traditions and customs
In Sabirabad District of Azerbaijan after a wedding when the bride comes into her new house, her mother-in-law puts lavash on her shoulder and says: "Let you come to the house of wealth, let your foot be lucky". In the Novkhani settlement, after a funeral, it is customary for people to prepare kyulchya, which sometimes consists of halva wrapped up in lavash.

Dried lavash can be stored over a long time period (almost one year) and is used instead of leavened bread in Eucharist traditions by the Armenian Apostolic Church.

In art
Women baking lavash is a common theme that has inspired Armenian painters. One such portrait by the famous Soviet-era painter Minas Minassian is displayed at the National Museum of Art in Yerevan. A print of the painting Armenian Ladies Baking Lavash by Armenian American artist Manuel Tolegian was selected by U.S. President Gerald Ford to hang in the White House Bicentennial Collection. The weekend open-air arts-and-crafts market in downtown Yerevan offers many lavash-related paintings and handiworks, with renditions of happy women making lavash having become a common sight.

See also

 Barbari bread, a popular type of Iranian bread
 Chapati, an unleavened South Asian flatbread, made on a tava
 Markouk, an unleavened flatbread common in the Levant, made on a saj
 Matnakash, a traditional leavened Armenian bread
 Sangak, a type of leavened Iranian flatbread, made in an oven
 Taftan, a thicker leavened Iranian bread
 Tandyr nan, a Central Asian leavened bread made in a tandoor
 Naan, a leavened flatbread made in a tandoor or on a tava
 Tortilla
 Laffa

References

External links

 Lavash: Understanding Armenia's bread obsession
 On the Lavash Trail in Armenia
 Lavash in Dictionary.com

Flatbreads
Armenian breads
Assyrian cuisine
Azerbaijani cuisine
Iranian cuisine
Iranian breads
Iraqi cuisine
Middle Eastern cuisine
Turkish cuisine
Articles containing video clips
Soviet cuisine
Kyrgyz cuisine
Kazakhstani cuisine
Jewish cuisine